Farah Ruma is a Bangladeshi model and television actress. Farah Ruma won Lux Anandadhara MS. Photogenic award in 1997.

Personal life 
She married an American expatriate businessman on December 1 in 2012. On August 30, 2016, Farah Ruma gave birth to a baby boy in USA. She named his son Janash. She was born on 26 March.

Career 
Farah Ruma started her career as a model. In 1997 Farah Ruma won a beauty contest called Lux-Anandadhara MS. Photogenic award. In 2002 she was seen in Afzal Hossain's drama Shako.  She appeared in Shuvodrishti, directed by Ferdous Hassan in 2004. Shuvodrishti is based on story by Rabindranath Tagore.

Farah Ruma acted in numerous television dramas, tvc & teleflims. She was presenter on the television show Amaro Gaite Ichche Holo. Ruma was one of the judges of the talent hunt, "Lux-Channel i Super Star 2009. She now own a production house known as FR Productions.

Works

Television Drama

Drama Series

Telefilms

Films

TVC 
Lux

Cosmos Biscuit

Purbachal City

TV Show 
Amaro Gaite Ichche Holo

References 

Living people
People from Dhaka
21st-century Bangladeshi actresses
Bangladeshi female models
Bangladeshi television actresses
1973 births